Revaz Gigauri (born 9 May 1984, in Kazbegi) is a Georgian rugby union player who plays as a fullback and as a centre.

Gigauri moved to France, where he has been playing for Montluçon Rugby (2006/07–2007/08), RC Massy (2008/09), GS Figeac (2009/10) and Boulogne-Billancourt, since 2010/11.

He has currently 34 caps for Georgia, since 2006, with 2 tries scored, 10 points on aggregate. He was called for the 2007 Rugby World Cup, playing three games, and for the 2011 Rugby World Cup, playing three games once again but remaining scoreless.

References

External links

1984 births
Living people
Rugby union players from Georgia (country)
Rugby union fullbacks
Rugby union centres
Expatriate rugby union players from Georgia (country)
Expatriate rugby union players in France
Expatriate sportspeople from Georgia (country) in France
Georgia international rugby union players